The F engine family from Mazda is a mid-sized inline-four piston engine with iron block, alloy head and belt-driven SOHC and DOHC configurations. Introduced in 1983 as the 1.6-litre F6, this engine was found in the Mazda B-Series truck and Mazda G platform models such as Mazda 626/Capella as well as many other models internationally including Mazda Bongo and Ford Freda clone, Mazda B-series based Ford Courier, Mazda 929 HC and the GD platform-based Ford Probe

There were four basic head types within the F range, the diesel SOHC 8-valve (R-series), the petrol SOHC 8-valve, petrol SOHC 12-valve, and the petrol DOHC 16-valve. These heads came attached to multiple variations of the different blocks and strokes. Only the petrol 8-valve and 12-valve shared the same gasket pattern. It was built at the Miyoshi Plant in Miyoshi, Hiroshima, Japan.

Predecessors (VC/MA/F) 
These engines are only the predecessors to the F-series engines, in no other way related. They were fitted to rear-wheel drive models in a longitudinal arrangement. This is in contrast to the successor engines that were designed for transverse front-wheel drive applications as had become the trend in the late-1970s and early-1980s.

VC
It was all new in 1975 (pre-1975 1.8 Couriers got the earlier, long-stroke VB engine) and has an alloy eight-valve head on an iron block.

Applications:
 1975–1978 Mazda Luce / 929
 1975–1977 Mazda Cosmo / 121
 1977–1981 Mazda Luce / 929
 1977–1984 Mazda B1800/Proceed PE2V
 1978–1982 Mazda Capella/626
 1975–1978 Ford Courier
 1978–1983 Mazda Bongo
 1974-1977 Mazda Parkway

MA/F
The  was designated MA. A more fuel-efficient 1–barrel version produced . Later on, this engine was designated the F.

Applications:
 1981–1982 Mazda Luce/Mazda Cosmo
 1975–1980 Mazda Luce/929
 1979–1988 Mazda 929 Wagon
 1979–1982 Mazda Capella/626
 1977–1985 Mazda B2000 (Officially, there was no 1985 year model for the B-Series in the USA. They skipped to 1986 for this line of vehicles for that market.)
 1977–1985 Ford Courier (The Ford Courier was canceled in the USA in 1982 to make room for the Ford Ranger the following year.)

F6
The smallest of the F-family engines is the F6 8-valve SOHC engine. It replaced the F/NA 1.6 from the previous generation.

Applications:
 1983–1987 Mazda Capella/626
 1983–1985 Mazda B1600

F8

Applications:
 1983–1991 Mazda Capella/626
 1988-1992 Mazda Persona/Eunos 300
 1984-2005 Mazda Bongo/Ford Econovan
 1989-1994 Kia Capital
 1988-1991 Kia Concord
 1993-1999 Asia Rocsta

F8-DOHC

The F8-DOHC is a DOHC F8 and basically a de-stroked version of the FE-DOHC displacing . It uses the same exhaust cam, but a different intake cam with less lift and a long, single-runner intake manifold. The F8 is usually identified by its unpainted cam cover. It is usually found in wagon variants.

Applications:
 1988–1996 Mazda Capella/626
 1990-1992 Mazda Persona/Eunos 300

FE
The  FE has a square  bore and stroke. It was available as an 8-valve SOHC and 12-valve SOHC.

Applications:
 1983–1991 Mazda Capella/626
 1982-1987 Ford Telstar
 1985–1987 Mazda B-Series
 1985–1999 Mazda E-series
 1981–1990 Mazda 929
 1987-1995 Kia Concord

FET

It was a variant of the 8-valve SOHC FE Featuring a small turbocharger and no intercooler producing  of boost. As such it features the same  bore and stroke of the FE. The Japanese variant of this engine was dubbed the Magnum Turbo and produces .

Applications:
 1986–1987 Mazda Capella/626
 1986–1987 Ford Telstar Turbo
 1986–1987 Mazda 929 coupe

FE-DOHC

The FE-DOHC is the 16 valve DOHC variant of the FE. The official Mazda engine codes of newer iterations are FE-DE and FE-ZE, depending on output level. Commonly called the FE3 which is also stamped into its head castings. The FE-DOHC shares the same dimensions as the original FE-SOHC, including the square  bore x stroke and it has a 1.74 rod/stroke ratio. The FE-DOHC is usually identified by a gold-coloured cam cover, however not always.  There were at least five different FE-DOHC engines available with various compression ratio, camshaft and ECU tuning combinations, however none were fitted with a turbocharger from the factory. In European 10.0:1 compression, non-catalytic trim, the FE-DOHC produces 148 ps (108 kW) at 6000 rpm and 133 lb/ft (182 Nm) at 4000 rpm. The 9.2:1 compression, catalytic converter version produces 140 ps. The Japanese domestic market variants produce anywhere between 145 ps and 165 ps. The only vehicle with 165ps was the 96-97 Capellas Wagons, FX (MT or AT) or FX Cruising (Only exists in AT). These received different tail lights to the earlier wagons.

The FE-DOHC was a European and Japanese market engine only (excluding use by Kia), and as such was only ever delivered in vehicles by Mazda to countries in those markets, with the exception of New Zealand who also received European market models. The engine was first fitted to the GD model 1988-1992 626 GT, 1987-1991 Capella and the 626 Coupe GT 2.0i/Capella C2 GT-X and GT-R. In South Africa, Samcor who built Mazdas under licence also fitted the FE-DOHC engine to the Mazda 323 from 1991 to 1994.

Alongside the sedan, hatch and coupé models the FE-DOHC was also being used in the GV wagon, which ran until 1997. The rest of the world mainly received the FE-DOHC in the 1995–2003 Kia Sportage, built by Kia under license. Kia first introduced the engine in March 1992, when they installed it in the Kia Concord, a license built version of the 1982 Mazda Capella. The Sportage variant was reconfigured for rear-wheel drive configuration with long single-runner intake manifold, low-duration cams and exclusively in the low compression ratio of 9.2:1.

Applications:
 1988–1997 Mazda Capella/626
 1991–1993 323 200i (South Africa)
 1992–1993 Ford Laser 2.0iRS and Meteor 2.0 16v (South Africa)
 1995–2003 Kia Sportage
 1992-1995 Kia Concord

Capella Cargo variants

Design
The Mazda FE-DOHC uses a wide-angle, DOHC, belt-driven valvetrain configuration with flat-tappet 33 mm HLA bucket lifters. It is a non interference design. There are two valve springs per valve and four valves per cylinder. While a dual valve spring configuration is used, the stock springs are fairly low-sprung. Low spring rates were chosen for fuel efficiency and increased valvetrain longevity, and low friction with the dual valve springs for the reduction of harmonics and increased valve stability.

The head gasket used on the Kia version can be sourced in North America, but the builder must note that the coolant passage holes are configured for a RWD cooling system. Attempting to use the RWD head gasket in FWD cooling configuration will result in improper flow and can result in overheating of cylinder #4. Like many DOHC engines, this engine has an interference valvetrain design, making periodic timing belt changes vital to the engine's life. Should the timing belt break the engine should be replaced as piston and valvetrain damage will occur.

The Mazda FE-DOHC came with several different camshaft profiles from the factory. As such there were several camshaft combinations available.

The F8K1 was the intake camshaft for the F8-DOHC, only listed due to family ties.

The combinations available:

VICS
The FE-DOHC featured Mazda's VICS system, short for Variable Inertia Control System, a variable intake setup to optimize runner length and resonance at different engine speeds. Much like Toyota's Acoustic Control Induction System, it had two sets of intake runners, a long set for low-medium RPMs, and a short set for high RPMs. It was operated by a vacuum solenoid based on the engine's current speed, actuating a pair of butterflies inside the manifold to open or close the short runners past 5400 RPM. This system has been used on many Mazda engines since including the BP. The K-series V6 engines used a different principle to the same effect dubbed VRIS. Two versions of the VICS intake system exist, one has steeper straighter runners than the other, which is kinked for vehicle packaging reasons. VICS was not present on the F8-DOHC or Kia version of the FE-DOHC, both of which use a conventional intake manifold design.

F2

Introduced for the 1988–1992 GD platform cars, it can also be found in the B2200 pickup and Ford Probe. A high-output variant of the F2 coded F2H2 was used in RWD configuration in the Mazda 929 HC. The compression ratio was raised to 9.2:1 and produced /. Although available as an 8-valve SOHC in the B2200, this engine is most commonly a 12-valve SOHC.

Applications:
 1986–1991 Mazda 929
 1988–1992 Mazda 626
 1988–1992 Mazda MX-6
 1989–1992 Ford Probe
 1987–1999 Mazda B2200

F2T

The F2T is a turbocharged version of the F2 equipped with an IHI-supplied RHB5 VJ11 turbocharger and an air-to-air intercooler. It is rumored that this figure was produced at the drive wheels, as this engine was suspected to be under-rated. However Mazda had only ever quoted these figures as SAE Net and DIN which are crankshaft rating standards, as required by law in the countries where the cars were sold. Due to the increased torque output, Mazda was forced to increase the strength of the transmission for the F2T, producing the H-type, the strongest FWD gearbox Mazda produced at the time.

Applications:
  Mazda 626 GT
  Mazda MX-6 GT
  Ford Probe GT
  Ford Telstar TX5 Turbo

R-series

The R-series engines are diesel variants that are very closely related to the F-series, sharing essentially the same engine block.

Later engines with 'F' nomenclature

The FS and FP are structurally different from the original F-blocks with much smaller bore spacing, much shorter deck height and smaller head and journal dimensions. The FS and FP are more closely related to the Mazda BP engine than they are with the original F-engine.

FS

In 1998 the engine evolved into the FS-DE by undergoing several changes, most notably a distributorless ignition as well as the move from hydraulic lifters to solid shim-on-bucket lifters. Japan received a couple of variations of the FS motor, all with increased power outputs. The highest being the Mazdaspeed Familia version of the FS-ZE which produced . This means that the Mazdaspeed Protegé's engine is internally identical to the regular FS-DE, except with a turbocharger installed.

The updated FS-DE engine did enjoy a few minor technical features, such as:
 Oil Squirters
 VICS (Variable Inertial Charge System) - A system that can vary the volume of the intake manifold resulting in a broader power band. There were known issues with this system, the most noteworthy was a defect which allowed screws that secured the VICS butterfly valves to come loose and end up being sucked into the engine. Some engines had to be replaced entirely due to the extent of the damage caused.
 VTCS (Variable Tumble Control System) - A set of butterflies in the intake manifold that would close to promote low emissions combustion under cold start at low engine speeds. These had a reputation of being noisy at times.
 Windage Tray

Applications:
 1993–2002 Mazda 626
 1993–1997 Mazda MX-6
 1999–2001 Mazda MPV (Japan)
 1999–2003 Mazda Capella
 2001–2003 Mazda Protegé
 1993–1997 Ford Probe
 1993–1999 Ford Telstar

FP

This engine is often incorrectly called the F8, which is the earlier destroked engine based on the FE. The FP enjoys a much better power band vs the FS due to slightly different camshafts and a better rod ratio over the regular FS-DE.

The FP is very close to the FS in many ways and shares a large percentage of parts but has its own FP specific block, crank, rods, pistons and timing belt. The pistons for the FS produce a compression ratio of 9.1:1 (USDM) but when FP pistons are used in the FS they yield 9.7:1 compression ratio. The KL & FS ATX engines both require 10° BTDC ignition timing while the FS MTX & FP require 12° BTDC. The FP does not share the same G25M-R transmission as the FS. In the Protegé it uses a F25M-R instead.

Applications:
 1992–1993 Eunos 500
 1997–2001 Mazda Capella/Mazda 626 
 1999–2000 Mazda Protegé (ES models only)
 1998-2003 Mazda 323 Astina & Protege (Australia)
 1998-2002 Ford Laser
 1999-2004 Mazda Premacy

References

3. Chilton's Repair and Tune-up guide Mazda Pickups 1971-86 copyright 1986
4. http://protegefaq.net/

External links

Mazda engines
Straight-four engines
Gasoline engines by model